is a Japanese theatre director, actor, novelist, and screenwriter.

Career
Born in Kitakyushu, Fukuoka, Matsuo started his own theatre troupe, Otona Keikaku, in 1988 and was joined by such talent as Kankuro Kudo and Sadao Abe. He won the Kishida Prize for Drama in 1997 for Fankī! Uchū wa mieru tokoro made shika nai. In addition to acting and directing, he also writes, and won the Japan Academy Prize for Screenplay of the Year in 2008 for Tokyo Tower: Mom and Me, and Sometimes Dad. As a novelist, he has twice been nominated for the Akutagawa Prize.

Selected filmography

As director
Otakus in Love (2004)
Female (2005) segment "Yoru no Shita (Licking Nights)"
Welcome to the Quiet Room (2007)
Jinuyo Saraba: Kamuroba Mura e (2015)
108: Revenge and Adventure of Goro Kaiba (2019)

As actor

Film
 Ichi the Killer (2001)
 Be with You (2004)
 Yaji and Kita: The Midnight Pilgrims (2005)
 Forbidden Siren (2006)
 The Shock Labyrinth (2009)
 Tada's Do-It-All House (2011)
 Shin Godzilla (2016)
 Tornado Girl (2017)
 Louder!: Don't See What You Are Singing (2018)
 Dragon Quest: Your Story (2019)
 108: Revenge and Adventure of Goro Kaiba (2019) - Gorō Kaiba
 Kaiji: Final Game (2020)
 I Am Makimoto (2022)
 Shin Kamen Rider (2023)

Television
Taro no To (2011) - Okamoto Taro
Amachan (2013)
Chikaemon (2016) – Chikamatsu Monzaemon
Miotsukushi Ryōrichō (2017)
Idaten (2019) – Tachibanaya Enkyō IV

References

External links
 

Japanese male actors
1962 births
Living people
Japanese theatre directors
Japanese film directors
Japanese screenwriters
People from Kitakyushu
20th-century Japanese novelists
21st-century Japanese novelists